Jakarta International Velodrome is a sporting facility located at Rawamangun, East Jakarta, Indonesia. The velodrome was built by ES Global Ltd working with local construction company Wika. The arena was used as a venue for 2018 Asian Games and 2018 Asian Para Games. The Velodrome covers an area of about 9.5 hectares. The sports arena has a 250 m cycling track, designed by Schuermann Architects, tennis court and swimming pools. The velodrome has a seating capacity of 3,500 for track cycling, and up to 8,500 for shows and concerts. Although made for cycling races, the complex will also be used for various sports activities such as volleyball, badminton, and futsal. The velodrome is certified as “Class 1”  by the Union Cycliste Internationale (UCI).

The original venue was built in 1973 and demolished to make way for the modern velodrome. Previously, the old velodrome was used as the venue for the 2011 Southeast Asian Games. The old velodrome was outdoor and classified as national standard, but after renovation the cycling venue has transformed into international standard indoor velodrome and certified by UCI. In February 2023, the velodrome hosted the first event of UCI Track Cycling Nations Cup.

See also
List of velodromes

References 

Multi-purpose stadiums in Indonesia
Sports venues in Jakarta
Post-independence architecture of Indonesia
East Jakarta
Velodromes in Indonesia
Venues of the 2018 Asian Games
Asian Games cycling venues
Sports venues completed in 1973